Jeffrey Howard Smulyan (born April 6, 1947 in Indianapolis, Indiana) is the founder and chief executive officer of Emmis Communications.

Early life and education
Smulyan is the son of Natalie and Sam Smulyan. He has one brother and one sister. His father owned the local Howard Johnson motel franchise and was president of Congregation Beth-El Zedeck. A cum laude graduate of the University of Southern California with a B.A. in History and Telecommunications, Smulyan earned a Juris Doctor degree from USC School of Law, where he served as note and comment editor of the USC Law Review.

Career
In 1973, he returned to Indianapolis where his father purchased WNTS-AM for $400,000 and named Jeff vice president and general manager.  WNTS was a talk station, which employed David Letterman, and the format was changed to all-news when NBC launched an all news service in 1975, the NBC News and Information Service. When NBC abandoned the format after only two years, WNTS was switched to religious broadcasting.  Two years later, they purchased KCRO in Omaha, which was also religious.  In 1980, he founded Emmis Broadcasting Corporation as the principal shareholder and began to purchase radio stations: WENS in Indianapolis; WLOL in Minneapolis; KSHE in St. Louis; KPWR in Los Angeles; WQHT (1986) and WHN (1986) in New York; and WAVA (1986) in Washington D.C. making EMMIS the largest privately owned radio broadcasting company in America.  In 1987, WHN was switched to WFAN, the first all sports radio station in America. In 1988, he purchased KXXX in San Francisco; WKQX in Chicago; WJIB in Boston; and WYNY and WNBC in New York. He also purchased the Indianapolis Monthly magazine. In 1991, he sold WFAN for $70 million, the highest price ever paid for a radio station at the time.

Emmis grew to build and own iconic brands like Hot 97 in New York City, Power 106 in Los Angeles, KSHE in St. Louis, Q101 in Chicago, WVUE-TV in New Orleans and Texas Monthly and Los Angeles magazines. At one time, Emmis owned 15 television stations, six monthly city/regional magazines, and more than 20 radio stations.

As of 2020, Indianapolis-based Emmis (the Hebrew word for truth) owns a radio portfolio consisting of 4 FM and 2 AM radio stations in Indianapolis and New York City.  Emmis owns Indianapolis Monthly magazine, as well as a controlling interest in Digonex, which provides dynamic pricing solutions across multiple industries.  In March 2020, Emmis acquired the sound masking business of Lencore Acoustics Corporation, the world leader in high-quality sound masking solutions for offices and other commercial applications.

Emmis developed and licensed TagStation; developed NextRadio, a smartphone application that paired FM radio broadcasts with visual and interactive features on smartphones; and created DialReport, a data attribution platform for the radio industry.

Seattle Mariners
In 1989, Smulyan with partners, purchased the Seattle Mariners from George Argyros for $75 million. Smulyan held the largest interest and contributed $35 million while the remainder was contributed by Morgan Stanley ($20 million); other investors ($5 million); and the remainder via bank financing.

In 2005, Smulyan was one of the final eight bidders vying to buy the Washington Nationals, but Ted Lerner ended up winning the bid.

Honors and accolades
In 1994, Smulyan was named by the White House to head the U.S. Delegation to the Plenipotentiary Conference of the International Telecommunication Union. As a U.S. ambassador, he helped negotiate a landmark agreement between Israel and the Palestine Liberation Organization.

Smulyan is a former director of the National Association of Broadcasters, former chair of the Radio Advertising Bureau, past chair of the Central Indiana Corporate Partnership, and a member of numerous civic boards and committees.  He serves on the board of trustees of his alma mater, University of Southern California.

Smulyan has been recognized as a Giant of Broadcasting by the Library of American Broadcasting, received the National Association of Broadcasters National Radio Award, and was inducted in the Broadcasting & Cable Hall of Fame and the Indiana Business Hall of Fame. The Broadcasters Foundation honored him with its Golden Mike Award and in 2017 he received the Lowry Mays Excellence in Broadcasting Award from the Broadcasters Foundation of America. He has received the Indianapolis Business Journal's Mike Carroll Award for civic leadership and he was named an Indiana Living Legend by the Indiana Historical Society.

Emmis was named one of Fortune magazines 100 Best Companies to Work For for its vibrant, collaborative culture.

Personal life
In 1981, Smulyan and then-wife Janine appeared as contestants on the game show Las Vegas Gambit. In 2003, he married Heather Hill.  Smulyan has three children: Samantha, Cari and Bradley, and two grandchildren.

References 

Major League Baseball owners
Seattle Mariners owners
Jewish American baseball people
USC Gould School of Law alumni
1947 births
Businesspeople from Indianapolis
Living people
American chief executives
20th-century American businesspeople
21st-century American Jews